The 1994–95 Croatian First Football League was the fourth season of the top-level league in Croatia since its establishment. This was the first season where three points were awarded for a win.

Promoted teams 
Neretva were promoted as winners of the Druga HNL (South) division and Marsonia were promoted as the winners of the Druga HNL (North) division. The league was therefore reduced to 16 teams, since four clubs were relegated in the previous season.

Stadia and personnel 

 1 On final match day of the season, played on 4 June 1995.

League table

Results

Relegation 
The league structure was changed after the 1994-95 season, whereby the four relegated teams this season played the next season in League 1-B.

Top goalscorers

See also 
 1994–95 Croatian Football Cup

References and notes 

 UEFA Site
 http://rsssf.org/tablesk/kroa95.html

External links 
 Table and results at Prva HNL official website 
 1994–95 in Croatian football at Rec.Sport.Soccer Statistics Foundation

Croatian Football League seasons
Cro
Prva Hnl, 1994-95